Rosa Henderson (November 24, 1896 – April 6, 1968) was an American jazz and classic female blues singer and vaudeville entertainer of the Harlem Renaissance era.

Life and career
Born Rosa Deschamps in Henderson, Kentucky, she is remembered as one of the great female blues singers of the 1920s and 1930s classic blues era. Her career as an entertainer began in 1913 when she joined her uncle's circus troupe. She married Douglas "Slim" Henderson in 1918 and began traveling with his Mason-Henderson show. Her career as a musical comedian started during the early 1920s, after she moved to New York, where she performed on Broadway. She eventually also performed in London.

Her nine-year recording career began in 1923. During that time she recorded over one hundred songs, sometimes using pseudonyms such as Sally Ritz, Flora Dale, Sarah Johnson, Josephine Thomas, Gladys White, and Mamie Harris. She was accompanied by the Virginians, Fletcher Henderson's Jazz Five, Fletcher Henderson's Orchestra, Fletcher Henderson's Club Alabam Orchestra, the Choo Choo Jazzers, the Kansas City Five, the Three Jolly Miners, the Kansas City Four, the Three Hot Eskimos, and the Four Black Diamonds. She recorded for Ajax Records, Columbia, Paramount, Victor, and Vocalion Records.

Her recordings include "Afternoon Blues" (1923), "Doggone Blues" (1931), "Do Right Blies" (1924), "He May Be Your Dog But He's Wearing My Collar" (1924), and "Papa If You Can't Do Better (I'll Let a Better Papa Move In)" (1926). She sang the chorus on Fletcher Henderson's May 28, 1924, Vocalion recording of "Do That Thing".

Although there was a marked decline in the number of her recordings after 1926, which was largely due to the death of her husband, Slim, in 1928, she continued performing until 1932, when she took a job in a New York department store. She continued to perform benefit concerts until the 1960s.

Henderson had two children and died of a heart attack in 1968.

She is unrelated to Fletcher, Horace, Katherine, or Edmonia Henderson.

See also
Four Eleven Forty Four
Classic female blues

References

External links
 Rosa Henderson 
 
 Farewell Rosa Henderson By Derrick Stewart-Baxter (from Jazz Journal July 1968, p.16)
 Rosa Henderson (1896-1968) Red Hot Jazz Archive

1896 births
1968 deaths
Jazz musicians from Kentucky
People from Henderson, Kentucky
Singers from Kentucky
American jazz singers
Classic female blues singers
Ajax Records artists
Columbia Records artists
Paramount Records artists
Vocalion Records artists
Kentucky women musicians
20th-century American singers
20th-century American women singers